The Fugitive Doctor is an incarnation of the Doctor, the protagonist of the BBC science fiction television programme Doctor Who. She is portrayed by the English actress Jo Martin, the first non-white person to play the role. 

Within the programme's narrative, the Doctor is a Time Lord, from the planet Gallifrey. They travel in time and space in their time capsule, the TARDIS. Due to their alien physiology, the Doctor, when critically injured, can regenerate their body, gaining a new physical appearance and personality. This plot device has allowed a number of actors, both male and female, to portray the Doctor through the decades. Each actor to play the Doctor offers a different take on the Doctor's essential personality. Martin's portrayal of the Doctor is a battle-hardened figure who doesn't suffer fools gladly, with an authoritative and composed demeanour. Unlike most incarnations of the character, Martin's Doctor will readily make use of physical combat and available weaponry to decisively end conflict.

The Fugitive Doctor is a more ruthless incarnation of the character. It was initially unknown where this incarnation, who is encountered during the Thirteenth Doctor's (Jodie Whittaker) era, fitted within the show's fictional chronology, although many commenters speculated that she was from the Doctor's past, prior to the First Doctor. It was confirmed in "Once, Upon Time" (2021) that she is a past incarnation of the Doctor, from a period that was, at some point, erased from the Doctor's memory, though it is still unknown specifically where this incarnation fits in. The Thirteenth Doctor first encounters her on Earth, where she had hidden herself from the Time Lords, for whom she had been compelled to work as part of the mysterious "Division".

Appearances

The Fugitive Doctor first appears in "Fugitive of the Judoon", disguised as human tour guide Ruth Clayton by means of a Chameleon Arch. As Ruth, she lives alongside her "husband" Lee in 21st century Gloucester with no knowledge of her true nature. The Judoon locate her and invade the city, intending to present her to Galifreyan Commander Gat. Lee, a fellow Time Lord and fugitive, directs Ruth to a lighthouse, where her previous identity is restored. At the same time, the Thirteenth Doctor finds a police box buried in the grounds – Ruth's TARDIS. As they reveal their identities to one another it transpires that neither Doctor recognises the other, leading to confusion between the pair as they both assumed the other was a future version of themselves. After tricking Gat into accidentally killing herself with a malfunctioning gun, the Fugitive Doctor parts with her other self acrimoniously.

She reappears in "The Timeless Children", when the Thirteenth Doctor is trapped in the Matrix by the Master. He informs her that she is the Timeless Child, and had lived many lives prior to what she believed to be her first incarnation. In trying to escape and reconcile this knowledge with her identity, she encounters a projection of the Fugitive Doctor. The projection reminds her that she has never previously been defined by her past before disappearing.

The Fugitive Doctor reappears in "Once, Upon Time". In that episode, the Thirteenth Doctor has been cast back into her past timestream to her previous visit to the Temple of Atropos, where she last confronted the Ravagers known as Swarm and Azure. Thirteen finds she has no memory of the events, but upon spotting her reflection in a mirrored wall panel sees she is in her Fugitive Doctor incarnation. The Thirteenth Doctor learns that the Fugitive Doctor had led a team of Division operatives, including the Lupari officer Karvanista, to capture the two Ravagers and uses her past self's methods as an inspiration to fix the situation in the present.

In "The Vanquishers", Karvanista finally reveals to the Thirteenth Doctor that he was actually once the Fugitive Doctor's companion. However, she abandoned him at some point, which has made him bitter towards the Doctor. Karvanista is unable to tell the Thirteenth Doctor anything about her past as the Fugitive Doctor because the Division has implanted a device in his brain that will kill him if he tries. The Doctor later recovers a fob watch containing all of her lost memories, but she chooses to deposit it deeper into the TARDIS for safe-keeping until a time that she really needs it, rather than recovering those lost memories.

The Fugitive Doctor reappears in "The Power of the Doctor" as an AI hologram which is used to trick The Master after he has stolen the Doctor's body. The Fugitive Doctor assists Yaz and Vinder to bring the Doctor back.

Audio
On 23 April 2022, Big Finish Productions announced that Jo Martin would reprise her role for The Fugitive Doctor Adventures, a series of Doctor Who audio dramas following her incarnation of the Doctor after the events of "Fugitive of the Judoon".

Characterisation

The Fugitive Doctor is a darker incarnation, with an acerbic tongue and a short temper. She exhibits a violent streak when she attacks a Judoon and is more comfortable holding a gun, before manipulating a foe into unknowingly killing themselves with it. Comparisons have been drawn with previous incarnations. Martin herself compared her character's grumpier disposition to that of the Twelfth Doctor. She nonetheless exhibits all of the Doctor's heroic qualities and charm, encouraging her future self when she is trapped by the Master.

The character is also intended to hark back to earlier Doctors, to suggest that she is from the Thirteenth Doctor's past. She declines to use a sonic screwdriver and refers to the TARDIS as her "ship", much like the First Doctor. The interior of her TARDIS is also modelled after the set used in the 1960s, with white walls and an identical central console.

Her costume was designed by Ray Holman to reflect her sterner nature. Black combat trousers and boots both hint at a Doctor accustomed to fighting and call back to the costume of the Twelfth Doctor. A dark-coloured Scottish tweed waistcoat and frock coat, with a period cut after the classic Doctors, add to the suggestion of a fiercer incarnation. A brightly coloured shirt with a stand collar and frilled cuffs provide a contrast to hint at the Doctor's eccentricity and were made from African Kente cloth as a tribute to the actor's heritage and the significance of her casting. This Doctor has also occasionally worn a pair of yellow sunglasses with this outfit.

Casting

Jo Martin was cast as the programme's first black Doctor, a milestone which met with much praise from commentators.

It was not announced prior to the broadcast of the character's first appearance in "Fugitive of the Judoon" that a new Doctor would be debuting. Promotional materials credited Jo Martin only as playing Ruth, while she herself was not told that she would be playing the Doctor until she was offered the part after her audition. She was then only able to tell her husband the character she was playing.

Reception

Martin's performance as the Fugitive Doctor has been lauded by critics, with some expressing their desire to see more of the character on screen.

Notes

References

Fugitive
Television characters introduced in 2020
Female characters in television
Black people in television